Vernon Ellis Cosslett, FRS (16 June 1908 – 21 November 1990) was a British microscopist.

The eighth child (of six sons and five daughters) of Welsh cabinet maker and carpenter, later clerk of works on the estate of the Earl of Eldon at Stowell Park, then builder, Edgar William Cosslett (1871–1948) and Anne (née Williams; 1871–1951), he was raised at Cirencester and educated at Cirencester Grammar School, the University of Bristol, the Kaiser-Wilhelm-Institut, Berlin-Dahlem, and University College, London. He was a research fellow at Bristol after completing his PhD in 1932, having been awarded an H. H. Mills Memorial Fellowship, remaining there until 1935. He then lectured at Faraday House Engineering College, London, until 1939, whilst undertaking part-time research at Birkbeck College, London. Between 1939 and 1941 he was Keddey-Fletcher-Warr Research Fellow of London University, working at the University of Oxford as a temporary lecturer, then lecturing in physics at the University of Oxford Electrical Laboratory from 1941 to 1946.

From 1947, as an ICI Research Fellow, he worked with William Lawrence Bragg at the Cavendish Laboratory, Cambridge University on the electron microscope and founded the Electron Microscopy Department. He also developed improved x-ray machines.

Cosslett was elected Fellow of the Royal Society in 1972 and won the Royal Medal in 1979 "In recognition of his outstanding contributions to the design and development of the X-ray microscope, the scanning electron microprobe analyser, the high voltage and ultrahigh resolution (2.5A) electron microscopes and their applications in many disciplines."

He was elected president of the Royal Microscopical Society. and was also instrumental in the creation of International Federation of Societies for Electron Microscopy where he was president from 1970 till 1973.

Cosslett had married firstly, in 1936, Rosemary Wilson. During the Second World War, Cosslett provided accommodation for refugee scientists at his flat in Hampstead; thus he met Viennese physicist and microscopist Dr Anna Joanna Wischin (1912–1969) whom Cosslett married in 1940 following his divorce from his first wife. Dr Anna Cosslett also worked at the Cavendish Laboratory. He had a son and a daughter from his second marriage.

References

External links 

 The Papers of Dr Vernon Ellis Cosslett held at Churchill Archives Centre, Cambridge

Royal Medal winners
British physicists
Fellows of the Royal Society
Fellows of the Royal Microscopical Society
People educated at Cirencester Grammar School
1908 births
1990 deaths
Presidents of the International Federation of Societies for Microscopy